Madison County High School is the name of several educational institutions in the United States:

 Madison County High School (Alabama) in Gurley, Alabama
 Madison County High School (Florida) in Madison, Florida
 Madison County High School (Georgia) in Danielsville, Georgia
 Madison County High School (Virginia) in Madison, Virginia